Jack Monroe (born 17 March 1988) is a British food writer, journalist and activist known for campaigning on poverty issues, particularly hunger relief. She initially rose to prominence by writing a blog titled A Girl Called Jack (now renamed Cooking on a Bootstrap), and has since written for publications such as The Echo, The Huffington Post and The Guardian, as well as publishing several cookbooks focusing on "austerity recipes" and meals which can be made on a tight budget.

Early life
Monroe was born in Southend-on-Sea in 1988 to David Hadjicostas MBE and Evelyn Hadjicostas (née Beatty), a former nurse. Her father is of Greek-Cypriot heritage; he served in the British Army for seven years, then with the fire service for 30 years. He was awarded an  MBE in 2007 Birthday Honours for services to children and families. Monroe has three siblings.

Monroe has described herself variously as working class and as middle class. She passed the 11-plus examinations and attended Westcliff High School for Girls, a grammar school in Westcliff-on-Sea. She left school at age 16, "bullied and disillusioned", with insufficient GCSEs (she sat 7 and passed 4 and a half of them) to progress to A Level. Despite her future career, she only achieved a low D grade in her home economics GCSE.

Monroe left home and worked in a chip shop and then Starbucks before taking a job as a call handler for Essex County Fire and Rescue Service. After having a child, she was unable to arrange the work around childcare responsibilities, and was unable to negotiate adjustments to her working pattern to make continued employment feasible. Monroe resigned the post after serving between 2007 and 2011. After leaving the fire service, Monroe began going by the forename Jack – being short for "Jack of all trades". She spent the following 18 months on benefits and looking for work, and moved from relative affluence to poverty and financial hardship. At the end of 2011 and after the birth of her son, she changed her name to Jack Monroe via deed poll.

Career

Writing 
Monroe came to prominence in the media through writing the blog A Girl Called Jack, sharing cheap recipes created as a single parent with a young child, and aiming to provide family meals for less than £10 per week. In December 2015, the blog was renamed as Cooking on a Bootstrap. She chose to write the blog under a pseudonym: 'Jack' was a childhood nickname and 'Monroe' was a tribute to Marilyn Monroe.

In 2012, Monroe became a weekly columnist for The Echo, a south Essex daily newspaper, and in February 2013, was taken on by the same as a trainee reporter – the timing was fortunate, as she was having difficulty affording nursery fees. Monroe was later retained as an unpaid columnist for The Huffington Post, before signing a publishing deal with Penguin Group. The book deal, reported as worth £25,000, resulted in housing benefit being cut off and Monroe came close to being evicted, which led to moving into cheaper accommodation. Despite working every day, she was unable to make ends meet. By January 2014, finances had improved, and Monroe was able to move into a small two-bedroom flat with her son.

Monroe formerly wrote a twice-monthly food and recipe column for The Guardian and additionally contributed a number of political columns, as well as being featured in The New York Times and The New Yorker. Monroe has written several budget cooking recipe books.

In April 2020, it was announced that Monroe would co-host Daily Kitchen Live on BBC One alongside Matt Tebbutt. The programme, made in response to issues stemming from the COVID-19 pandemic, offered tips and guidance to families struggling with limited resources, and aired daily for a two-week period that commenced on 14 April 2020.

Campaigning and politics 
Monroe has been an active campaigner for a number of causes in the UK, particularly those concerned with poverty and hunger, campaigning alongside organisations such as Unite, The Trussell Trust, Child Poverty Action Group and Oxfam.

In 2013, Monroe appeared in a six-week advertising campaign for Sainsbury's supermarket. Monroe accepted the equivalent of the living wage for the six weeks that the campaign ran and donated the remainder of the fee to charities including a food bank.

Monroe appeared in a Labour Party campaign video in October 2013. She left the Labour Party in March 2015, after disagreeing with its rhetoric on immigration, and became a member of the Green Party of England and Wales, also in March 2015. In April 2016, Monroe appeared online supporting the Women's Equality Party. In the 2017 United Kingdom general election, Monroe intended to stand in Southend West as a candidate for the National Health Action Party, but withdrew after receiving death threats and because of health problems. In January 2021, Monroe tweeted that she was a "fully paid up member of the Labour Party and have been for quite some time now." Monroe has voiced her support for Scottish independence. "Scotland deserves better than the scraps that Westminster reluctantly throws every now and then while bleeding your resources dry," she tweeted on 7 July 2022. "Happy to come and campaign for the #indyref2 any time - have a lot of love for your beautiful country."

Speaking in 2014, Monroe described life as having "changed beyond recognition", but said that she is still affected by her experience of poverty. The University of Essex announced in May 2015 that it would be awarding Monroe an honorary degree.

In 2015, Monroe won the Women of the Future Award in the media category. Monroe was "surprised", saying "I'm not sure I'll even be a woman in the future". The award was won after Monroe came out as non-binary, which created some controversy. The subsequent "gender debate" angered Monroe and she questioned the headlines of some newspapers, saying "Because of my trans identity, I'm attacked for accepting a real woman's award."

Monroe appeared on BBC television's late night political programme This Week in June 2015 and again in May 2019.

In May 2017, Monroe participated in a "blind election date" with British television personality Georgia Toffolo in which they discussed politics.

In January 2022, Monroe complained that food prices were rising faster than the official inflation rate, which hit poor people hardest. The Office for National Statistics agreed that one inflation rate did not reflect everybody's experience, and noted that they had been working since 2021 to revise the Consumer Price Index, to more accurately measure changes in consumer prices. Monroe stated, "Delighted to be able to tell you that the ONS have just announced that they are going to be changing the way they collect and report on the cost of food prices and inflation to take into consideration a wider range of income levels and household circumstances." Monroe announced plans to launch a new price index, called the Vimes Boots Index (VBI), highlighting the greater cost of poverty.

In March 2022, Monroe complained that due to inflation poor people could not afford food, fuel and rent, and were having to go without food or fuel, or were eating unhealthily because they could not afford healthy food. Monroe called for social security benefits to be raised in line with inflation. In May 2022, Monroe criticised Conservative MP Lee Anderson's praise in the House of Commons for a food bank which has a compulsory cooking and budgeting class for those accepting food parcels.

Controversy 
In November 2014, Monroe said on Twitter that then-Prime Minister of the United Kingdom David Cameron "uses stories about his dead son as misty-eyed rhetoric to legitimise selling our NHS to his friends". The Daily Mail journalist Sarah Vine criticised Monroe for using the death of Cameron's severely disabled son for political purposes and "choosing" a life of poverty. The Independent described this as a "caustic attack", and Monroe replied on Twitter that the column was "homophobic, transphobic, deadnaming [and] ignorant".

In May 2022, Member of Parliament for Ashfield, Lee Anderson stated that Monroe was "taking money off some of the most vulnerable people in society and making an absolute fortune [off] the back of people". In response, Monroe indicated that she intended to sue Anderson for libel. In a January 2023 interview with Simon Hattenstone in The Guardian, Monroe acknowledged that she had recklessly spent money given by backers; she claimed "I’d go online absolutely shitfaced and buy nice furniture.” Hattenstone wrote "The guru of thriftiness was chucking away tens of thousands of pounds, given to her by the public to support her work, on items she didn’t even want, let alone need", noting that she didn't deny she'd "abused the goodwill of well-meaning backers".

Writing for Pink News in September 2022, Lily Wakefield noted that Monroe has "faced accusations of inventing experiences of living in poverty", while in October 2022 Killian Fox noted in The Guardian that "critics claim that she makes herself out to be poorer than she actually is". In January 2023, Kathleen Stock (writing for UnHerd) stated that Monroe was "wedded to a narrative of personal struggle and sudden dramatic changes of fortune, for better or worse" with an "inability to keep a story straight about whether she’s really a downtrodden victim of a cruel system or rather #winningatlife", which had given rise to "an army of determined internet sleuths" and "a multi-headed hydra of critics on Twitter".

Personal life 
Monroe was diagnosed with autism and ADHD as a child, though was not made aware of this until she was an adult.

Monroe came out as non-binary in October 2015, and goes by they/them and she/her pronouns. She said she did not change her name to Jack while still working at the fire service, out of concern over "the potential for deadnaming and bullying in a not-particularly-tolerant organisation. Not a great place to be gay, let alone genderqueer."  She also did not take part in a fire-service passing out ceremony, because protocol would have required her to wear a skirt.  During this period, Monroe had a brief relationship with a male friend which resulted in a son. She also had a long-term relationship with a woman which ended shortly after Monroe told her partner she was considering a mastectomy.

Monroe had previously identified as a cisgender lesbian. In a February 2014 interview, she described herself as a "lefty, liberal, lezzer cook".

In 2014, it was reported that Monroe and her son were living with Monroe's then girlfriend Allegra McEvedy; the relationship ended in October 2015.

In 2017, Monroe said she was suffering from acute arthritis, citing the affliction as a partial cause for her suspending her campaign for candidacy in the National Health Action Party. Her arthritis led her to develop a dependency on the precription drug tramadol. In January 2019, Monroe stated that she was recovering from alcoholism, discussing how drinking had affected her work and personal life. She attended drug rehabilitation in 2021. 

In January 2019, Monroe announced her engagement to Louisa Compton; their relationship ended in 2021.

Legal actions
Monroe initiated legal action in 2015 after the Daily Mail claimed that "Jack" was not her "real" name, and has requested that her birth name not be used by the media. In 2014, three years after she legally changed her name, she stated that she still experienced deadnaming by people.

In 2017, Monroe won a libel case against newspaper columnist and television personality Katie Hopkins, after Hopkins suggested on Twitter that Monroe was supportive of vandalism of a war memorial, having confused Monroe with journalist Laurie Penny. Instead of apologising, Hopkins then labelled Monroe "social anthrax". The High Court awarded Monroe £24,000 in damages plus costs.

In May 2022, Monroe claimed she had instructed libel lawyers to prepare to sue Lee Anderson because he alleged that she makes money from poor people. Monroe wrote on Twitter that Anderson was "playing a very expensive game of chicken with someone who has a proven track record of crossing this particular road without fear nor favour".

Bibliography

Cookery books
 A Girl Called Jack: 100 delicious budget recipes (Michael Joseph, 2014) 
 A Year in 120 Recipes (Michael Joseph, 2014) 
 Cooking on a Bootstrap: Over 100 simple, budget recipes (Bluebird, 2018) 
 Tin Can Cook: 75 Simple Store-cupboard Recipes (Bluebird, 2019) 
 Vegan (ish): 100 simple, budget recipes that don't cost the earth (Bluebird, 2019) 
 Good Food for Bad Days: What to Make When You're Feeling Blue (Bluebird, 2020) 
 Thrifty Kitchen (Bluebird, 2023) ISBN 9781035008513

See also

 Poverty in the United Kingdom
 United Kingdom government austerity programme

Notes

References 

1988 births
Living people
British bloggers
British food writers
British journalists
British cookbook writers
Diet food advocates
People on the autism spectrum
Transgender writers
English people of Greek Cypriot descent
Green Party of England and Wales people
British Internet celebrities
English LGBT writers
Labour Party (UK) people
National Health Action Party people
People from Southend-on-Sea
Non-binary writers
Women's Equality Party people